Maryam Yahaya  is a Nigerian film actress in the Kannywood industry. She gained recognition for starring in Taraddadi, a movie directed by Elnass Ajenda. For her role, Yahaya was nominated as best promising actress by City People Entertainment Awards in 2017. She was also nominated as best actress by City People Entertainment Awards in 2018.

Career
Yahaya wanted to act from her childhood, and was inspired by the Hausa movies she watched. She made her debut in the film Gidan Abinci, followed by Barauniya and Tabo, in which she played minor roles. She gained fame after adapting a leading role originally meant for Bilkisu Shema in Mansoor, a sensation movie directed by Ali Nuhu.

Filmography

See also
 List of Nigerian actors
 List of Kannywood actors

References

1997 births
Hausa-language mass media
Living people
Actresses in Hausa cinema
21st-century Nigerian actresses
Hausa people
Nigerian film actresses
Kannywood actors
 Nigerian models
 People from Kano State